Daniel da Costa Franco (born 26 August 1971 in Butiá) is Brazilian football manager and former player who played as a left back. He is the current manager of União Frederiquense.

Honours
 Copa do Brasil: 1992, 1995
 Rio Grande do Sul State League: 1991, 1992, 1994
 São Paulo State League: 1995

References

External links
 Profile at Internacional.com.br 

1971 births
Living people
Brazilian footballers
Sport Club Internacional players
Sport Club Corinthians Paulista players
Clube Atlético Mineiro players
Esporte Clube Bahia players
Fortaleza Esporte Clube players
FC St. Pauli players
2. Bundesliga players
Sportspeople from Rio Grande do Sul
Association football fullbacks
Brazilian football managers
Clube Esportivo Lajeadense managers